All Mixed Up is an unauthorized remix album of songs by Gospel Gangstaz, according to group member Chille Babe.  It was released on January 14, 2003 for KMG Records.  It was the first Gospel Gangstaz album to not make it on the Billboard charts.

Track listing 
"Do or Die"- 6:12  
"CMC's Meet OGG's"- 4:30  
"Gospel Gangsta Voyage"- 4:20  
"Y Can't da Homiez Hear Me?"- 6:26  
"Gospel Gangsta Thang"- 5:13  
"Mobbin' (Gang Affiliated)"- 4:24  
"Tears of a Black Man"- 5:16  
"Testimony"- 10:29  
"Before Redemption"- 8:57  
"Tha Holy Terra"- 4:45  

Gospel Gangstaz albums
2003 remix albums
G-funk remix albums